Sikandrabad is a city and a municipal board, just outside of Bulandshahr city in Bulandshahr district in the Indian state of Uttar Pradesh. It is part of the Delhi NCR region. Sikandrabad tehsil is now a part of Bulandshahr district which is situated throughout 60+ villages.

Demographics
 India census, Sikandrabad had a population of 3,85,000. Men constitute 52% of the population and Women 48%. Sikandrabad has an average literacy rate of 50%, lower than the national average of 59.5%: male literacy is 58%, and female literacy is 49%. In Sikandrabad, 17% of the population is under 6 years of age.

Location
Sikandrabad is situated both side on G.T. road. It is about 51 km from the national capital, Delhi.

The city of Sikandrabad is located in Bulandshahr district of Uttar Pradesh state in northern India. It is situated on both side of GT road about 51 km south side of national capital Delhi. The district headquarters Bulandshahr is about 18 km from the city. Sikandrabad is well connected by roads and rails. Dankaur is the nearest railway station (6 km away) that serves Sikandrabad. Dadri, Gulaothi, Khair, Khurja, Jhajjar, Dankaur, Noida etc. are the other towns that have the direct road connectivity with the city. Sikandrabad is 6 km from Greater Noida.

PIN (Postal Index Number) of Sikandrabad is 203205. The STD code prefix is 05735. There are two post offices in the city. Speedpost is also available in the city.

The current population of Sikandrabad is around 300,000. The city has three post graduate colleges and a large number of other colleges and schools. Babbu Parveen is the Chairman of Sikandrabad. The oldest clinic Dr. Jamuna Prasad Sharma

History

Sikandrabad is a historical city which was built by Sikandar Lodhi in around 1498. Chishti and some other old monuments in the area can also be seen.

Sikandrabad is listed in the Ain-i-Akbari as a pargana under Delhi sarkar, producing a revenue of 1,259,190 dams for the imperial treasury and supplying a force of 400 infantry and 50 cavalry.

Notable people

 Acharya Chatursen Shastri Hindi writer, known for Vaishali Ki Nagarvadhu.
 Santosh Anand Bollywood Song writer.
Rahul Verma, social worker and activist; founder of Uday Foundation
Dr Shiv Lal, Public Health Professional and Special Director General Health Services, Government of India, Dr B.C. Roy National Awardee for Development of Community Health Specialty in India.

References

Cities and towns in Bulandshahr district